The University of Iowa School of Music is a part of the Division of Performing Arts of the College of Liberal Art & Sciences. The school trains musicians for professional careers in performance, composition, music therapy, music theory, musicology, conducting, and music education. Admission to the school is selective, requiring students to be admitted to the university itself before being able to apply and audition for the school of music, at least at the undergraduate level.

Programs of Study

Undergraduate
The school offers a Bachelor of Music degree with concentrations in performance, music therapy and composition as well as a Bachelor of Arts degree with a major in music and a music minor. Music majors with a performance concentration may elect to receive certification in music education, allowing them to teach public school. Additionally, an emphasis in jazz studies is also available to performance concentration students. Those with concentrations in music therapy gain certification in their field as part of the degree program.

Graduate/Postgraduate
Master of Arts, Master of Fine Arts, Doctor of Philosophy, and Doctor of Musical Arts degrees are all available. A certificate in sacred music is also available. Additionally, any graduate student in the school of music may earn a minor in theory pedagogy, designed to allow them to teach music theory at a college or conservatory level. Another option for some graduate students is to receive a Master of Arts degree en route to completing a Master of Fine Arts degree.

Center for New Music
The Center for New Music, or TCNM, was founded by matching grants between the university and the Rockefeller Foundation for the purpose of performing and composing new music of the classical style. Its current director is pianist, conductor, composer, and professor, David K. Gompper.

Notable faculty
Himie Voxman, Director 1954-1980
Uriel Tsachor, Piano (Department Head)
Ksenia Nosikova, Piano
Alan Huckleberry, Piano Pedagogy & Collaborative Piano
David Gier, Trombone and former Director (now at Michigan)
Marian Wilson Kimber, Musicology
Kenneth Tse, Saxophone
Rachel Joselson, Soprano
Stephen Swanson, Baritone
Benjamin Coelho, Bassoon
Nicole Esposito, Flute
Courtney Miller, Oboe
Dan Moore, Percussion
Philip Greeley Clapp, Director 1919-1953

References

Music schools in Iowa
University of Iowa
1906 establishments in Iowa